The year 1923 in archaeology involved some significant events.

Explorations
May 5: The Synagogue of Tomar in Portugal is purchased by scholar Samuel Schwarz for the purposes of excavation, restoration and preservation.
Expedition under Neil Merton Judd to collect dendrochronological specimens in order to date habitation of Chaco Canyon.
Exploration of Tasghîmût fortress in Morocco by Henri Basset and Henri Terrasse begins.

Excavations
 February 16: Howard Carter opens the inner chamber of Tutankhamun's tomb.
 Peking Man Site at Zhoukoudian, China is excavated a second time by Otto Zdansky under the supervision of Johan Gunnar Andersson.
 New excavations at Viroconium (Wroxeter) in England begin (continue to 1927).

Finds
 July 13 - An American Museum of Natural History expedition to Mongolia under Roy Chapman Andrews is the first in the world to discover fossil dinosaur eggs. Initially thought to belong to the ceratopsian Protoceratops, they were determined in 1995 actually to belong to the theropod Oviraptor.
 Material unearthed by Otto Zdansky's excavations at Peking Man Site in Zhoukoudian, China will eventually yield two human molars, but these finds are not announced until 1926.
 Copper Bull from Leonard Woolley's excavations at Ur.
 Bronze Age hoard found in Huelva harbour.

Publications
 O. G. S. Crawford - "Air Survey and Archaeology", The Geographical Journal (May).
 Cyril Fox - The Archaeology of the Cambridge Region.
 Ralph Linton - The Material Culture of the Marquesas Islands.

Births

Deaths
 February 15 - Charles Simon Clermont-Ganneau, French Orientalist (b. 1846)
 April 5 - George Herbert, 5th Earl of Carnarvon, British Egyptological excavation sponsor (b. 1866).

References

Archaeology
Archaeology
Archaeology by year